This is a list of the mammal species recorded in Mali. There are 146 mammal species in Mali, of which two are critically endangered, three are endangered, ten are vulnerable, and three are near threatened. One of the species listed for Mali can no longer be found in the wild.

The following tags are used to highlight each species' conservation status as assessed by the International Union for Conservation of Nature:

Some species were assessed using an earlier set of criteria. Species assessed using this system have the following instead of near threatened and least concern categories:

Order: Tubulidentata (aardvarks) 

The order Tubulidentata consists of a single species, the aardvark. Tubulidentata are characterised by their teeth which lack a pulp cavity and form thin tubes which are continuously worn down and replaced.

Family: Orycteropodidae
Genus: Orycteropus
 Aardvark, Orycteropus afer LC

Order: Hyracoidea (hyraxes) 

The hyraxes are any of four species of fairly small, thickset, herbivorous mammals in the order Hyracoidea. About the size of a domestic cat they are well-furred, with rounded bodies and a stumpy tail. They are native to Africa and the Middle East.

Family: Procaviidae (hyraxes)
Genus: Procavia
 Cape hyrax, P. capensis

Order: Proboscidea (elephants) 

The elephants comprise three living species and are the largest living land animals.
Family: Elephantidae (elephants)
Genus: Loxodonta
African bush elephant, L. africana

Order: Sirenia (manatees and dugongs) 

Sirenia is an order of fully aquatic, herbivorous mammals that inhabit rivers, estuaries, coastal marine waters, swamps, and marine wetlands. All four species are endangered.

Family: Trichechidae
Genus: Trichechus
 African manatee, Trichechus senegalensis VU

Order: Primates 

The order Primates contains humans and their closest relatives: lemurs, lorisoids, tarsiers, monkeys, and apes.

Suborder: Strepsirrhini
Infraorder: Lemuriformes
Superfamily: Lorisoidea
Family: Galagidae
Genus: Galagoides
 Prince Demidoff's bushbaby, Galagoides demidovi LR/lc
Genus: Galago
 Senegal bushbaby, Galago senegalensis LR/lc
Suborder: Haplorhini
Infraorder: Simiiformes
Parvorder: Catarrhini
Superfamily: Cercopithecoidea
Family: Cercopithecidae (Old World monkeys)
Genus: Erythrocebus
 Patas monkey, Erythrocebus patas LR/lc
Genus: Chlorocebus
 Green monkey, Chlorocebus sabaeus LR/lc
 Tantalus monkey, Chlorocebus tantalus LR/lc
Genus: Papio
 Olive baboon, Papio anubis LR/lc
 Guinea baboon, Papio papio LR/nt
Superfamily: Hominoidea
Family: Hominidae (great apes)
Subfamily: Homininae
Tribe: Panini
Genus: Pan
 Common chimpanzee, Pan troglodytes EN

Order: Rodentia (rodents) 

Rodents make up the largest order of mammals, with over 40% of mammalian species. They have two incisors in the upper and lower jaw which grow continually and must be kept short by gnawing.

Suborder: Hystricognathi
Family: Hystricidae (Old World porcupines)
Genus: Hystrix
 Crested porcupine, Hystrix cristata LC
Family: Thryonomyidae (cane rats)
Genus: Thryonomys
 Greater cane rat, Thryonomys swinderianus LC
Suborder: Sciurognathi
Family: Sciuridae (squirrels)
Subfamily: Xerinae
Tribe: Xerini
Genus: Xerus
 Striped ground squirrel, Xerus erythropus LC
Family: Gliridae (dormice)
Subfamily: Graphiurinae
Genus: Graphiurus
 Kellen's dormouse, Graphiurus kelleni LC
Family: Dipodidae (jerboas)
Subfamily: Dipodinae
Genus: Jaculus
 Lesser Egyptian jerboa, Jaculus jaculus LC
Family: Nesomyidae
Subfamily: Dendromurinae
Genus: Steatomys
 Northwestern fat mouse, Steatomys caurinus LC
 Dainty fat mouse, Steatomys cuppedius LC
Subfamily: Cricetomyinae
Genus: Cricetomys
 Gambian pouched rat, Cricetomys gambianus LC
Family: Muridae (mice, rats, voles, gerbils, hamsters, etc.)
Subfamily: Deomyinae
Genus: Acomys
 Western Saharan spiny mouse, Acomys airensis LC
 Johan's spiny mouse, Acomys johannis LC
Subfamily: Gerbillinae
Genus: Desmodilliscus
 Pouched gerbil, Desmodilliscus braueri LC
Genus: Dipodillus
 North African gerbil, Dipodillus campestris LC
Genus: Gerbillus
 Lesser Egyptian gerbil, Gerbillus gerbillus LC
 Pygmy gerbil, Gerbillus henleyi LC
 Sudan gerbil, Gerbillus nancillus DD
 Balochistan gerbil, Gerbillus nanus LC
 Nigerian gerbil, Gerbillus nigeriae LC
 Greater Egyptian gerbil, Gerbillus pyramidum LC
 Rupicolous gerbil, Gerbillus rupicola DD
 Tarabul's gerbil, Gerbillus tarabuli LC
Genus: Meriones
 Sundevall's jird, Meriones crassus LC
Genus: Tatera
 Guinean gerbil, Tatera guineae LC
 Kemp's gerbil, Tatera kempi LC
 Savanna gerbil, Tatera valida LC
Genus: Taterillus
 Gracile tateril, Taterillus gracilis LC
 Petter's gerbil, Taterillus petteri LC
 Senegal gerbil, Taterillus pygargus LC
 Tranieri's tateril, Taterillus tranieri DD
Subfamily: Murinae
Genus: Arvicanthis
 Sudanian grass rat, Arvicanthis ansorgei LC
Genus: Dasymys
 West African shaggy rat, Dasymys rufulus LC
Genus: Lemniscomys
 Senegal one-striped grass mouse, Lemniscomys linulus DD
 Heuglin's striped grass mouse, Lemniscomys zebra LC
Genus: Mastomys
 Guinea multimammate mouse, Mastomys erythroleucus LC
 Hubert's multimammate mouse, Mastomys huberti LC
 Natal multimammate mouse, Mastomys natalensis LC
Genus: Mus
 Hausa mouse, Mus haussa LC
 Matthey's mouse, Mus mattheyi LC
 African pygmy mouse, Mus minutoides LC
Genus: Praomys
 Dalton's mouse, Praomys daltoni LC
 Tullberg's soft-furred mouse, Praomys tullbergi LC
Family: Ctenodactylidae
Genus: Felovia
 Felou gundi, Felovia vae DD
Genus: Massoutiera
 Mzab gundi, Massoutiera mzabi LC

Order: Lagomorpha (lagomorphs) 

The lagomorphs comprise two families, Leporidae (hares and rabbits), and Ochotonidae (pikas). Though they can resemble rodents, and were classified as a superfamily in that order until the early 20th century, they have since been considered a separate order. They differ from rodents in a number of physical characteristics, such as having four incisors in the upper jaw rather than two.

Family: Leporidae (rabbits, hares)
Genus: Lepus
 Cape hare, Lepus capensis LR/lc
 African savanna hare, Lepus microtis LR/lc

Order: Erinaceomorpha (hedgehogs and gymnures) 

The order Erinaceomorpha contains a single family, Erinaceidae, which comprise the hedgehogs and gymnures. The hedgehogs are easily recognised by their spines while gymnures look more like large rats.

Family: Erinaceidae (hedgehogs)
Subfamily: Erinaceinae
Genus: Atelerix
 Four-toed hedgehog, Atelerix albiventris LR/lc
Genus: Hemiechinus
 Desert hedgehog, Hemiechinus aethiopicus LR/lc

Order: Soricomorpha (shrews, moles, and solenodons) 

The "shrew-forms" are insectivorous mammals. The shrews and solenodons closely resemble mice while the moles are stout-bodied burrowers.

Family: Soricidae (shrews)
Subfamily: Crocidurinae
Genus: Crocidura
 Cinderella shrew, Crocidura cinderella LC
 Fox's shrew, Crocidura foxi LC
 Savanna shrew, Crocidura fulvastra LC
 Bicolored musk shrew, Crocidura fuscomurina LC
 Lamotte's shrew, Crocidura lamottei LC
 Mauritanian shrew, Crocidura lusitania LC
 Somali shrew, Crocidura somalica LC
 Savanna path shrew, Crocidura viaria LC
 Voi shrew, Crocidura voi LC

Order: Chiroptera (bats) 

The bats' most distinguishing feature is that their forelimbs are developed as wings, making them the only mammals capable of flight. Bat species account for about 20% of all mammals.

Family: Pteropodidae (flying foxes, Old World fruit bats)
Subfamily: Pteropodinae
Genus: Eidolon
 Straw-coloured fruit bat, Eidolon helvum LC
Genus: Epomophorus
 Gambian epauletted fruit bat, Epomophorus gambianus LC
Genus: Lissonycteris
 Smith's fruit bat, Lissonycteris smithi LC
Genus: Micropteropus
 Peters's dwarf epauletted fruit bat, Micropteropus pusillus LC
Family: Vespertilionidae
Subfamily: Vespertilioninae
Genus: Eptesicus
 Horn-skinned bat, Eptesicus floweri VU
Genus: Neoromicia
 Banana pipistrelle, Neoromicia nanus LC
 Rendall's serotine, Neoromicia rendalli LC
Genus: Nycticeinops
 Schlieffen's bat, Nycticeinops schlieffeni LC
Genus: Scotophilus
 African yellow bat, Scotophilus dinganii LC
 White-bellied yellow bat, Scotophilus leucogaster LC
 Greenish yellow bat, Scotophilus viridis LC
Family: Rhinopomatidae
Genus: Rhinopoma
 Egyptian mouse-tailed bat, R. cystops 
 Lesser mouse-tailed bat, Rhinopoma hardwickei LC
 Greater mouse-tailed bat, Rhinopoma microphyllum LC
Family: Molossidae
Genus: Chaerephon
 Gland-tailed free-tailed bat, Chaerephon bemmeleni LC
 Lappet-eared free-tailed bat, Chaerephon major LC
 Little free-tailed bat, Chaerephon pumila LC
Genus: Mops
 Angolan free-tailed bat, Mops condylurus LC
 Mongalla free-tailed bat, Mops demonstrator NT
 Midas free-tailed bat, Mops midas LC
Family: Emballonuridae
Genus: Taphozous
 Egyptian tomb bat, Taphozous perforatus LC
Family: Nycteridae
Genus: Nycteris
 Gambian slit-faced bat, Nycteris gambiensis LC
 Hairy slit-faced bat, Nycteris hispida LC
 Large-eared slit-faced bat, Nycteris macrotis LC
 Egyptian slit-faced bat, Nycteris thebaica LC
Family: Megadermatidae
Genus: Lavia
 Yellow-winged bat, Lavia frons LC
Family: Rhinolophidae
Subfamily: Rhinolophinae
Genus: Rhinolophus
 Rüppell's horseshoe bat, Rhinolophus fumigatus LC
Subfamily: Hipposiderinae
Genus: Asellia
 Trident leaf-nosed bat, Asellia tridens LC
Genus: Hipposideros
 Sundevall's roundleaf bat, Hipposideros caffer LC
 Giant roundleaf bat, Hipposideros gigas LC
 Jones's roundleaf bat, Hipposideros jonesi NT
 Noack's roundleaf bat, Hipposideros ruber LC

Order: Pholidota (pangolins) 

The order Pholidota comprises the eight species of pangolin. Pangolins are anteaters and have the powerful claws, elongated snout and long tongue seen in the other unrelated anteater species.

Family: Manidae
Genus: Manis
 Giant pangolin, Manis gigantea LR/lc
 Long-tailed pangolin, Manis tetradactyla LR/lc

Order: Carnivora (carnivorans) 

There are over 260 species of carnivorans, the majority of which feed primarily on meat. They have a characteristic skull shape and dentition.

Suborder: Feliformia
Family: Felidae (cats)
Subfamily: Felinae
Genus: Acinonyx
 Cheetah, A. jubatus 
Northwest African cheetah, A. j. hecki 
Genus: Caracal
 African golden cat, Caracal aurata VU
 Caracal, Caracal caracal LC
Genus: Felis
African wildcat, F. lybica  
 Sand cat, F. margarita 
Genus: Leptailurus
 Serval, Leptailurus serval LC
Subfamily: Pantherinae
Genus: Panthera
 Lion, Panthera leo VU
 Leopard, Panthera pardus VU
Family: Viverridae
Subfamily: Viverrinae
Genus: Genetta
 Common genet, Genetta genetta LC
 Hausa genet, Genetta thierryi LC
Family: Hyaenidae (hyaenas)
Genus: Crocuta
 Spotted hyena, Crocuta crocuta LC
Genus: Hyaena
 Striped hyena, Hyaena hyaena NT
Suborder: Caniformia
Family: Canidae (dogs, foxes)
Genus: Vulpes
 Pale fox, Vulpes pallida LC
 Rüppell's fox, Vulpes rueppelli LC
 Fennec, Vulpes zerda LC
Genus: Canis
 African golden wolf, Canis lupaster LC
Genus: Lupulella
 Side-striped jackal, L. adusta  
Genus: Lycaon
 African wild dog, L. pictus  possibly extirpated
Family: Mustelidae (mustelids)
Genus: Ictonyx
 Saharan striped polecat, Ictonyx libyca LC
 Striped polecat, Ictonyx striatus LC
Genus: Mellivora
 Honey badger, Mellivora capensis LC
Genus: Hydrictis
 Speckle-throated otter, Hydrictis maculicollis LC

Order: Artiodactyla (even-toed ungulates) 

The even-toed ungulates are ungulates whose weight is borne about equally by the third and fourth toes, rather than mostly or entirely by the third as in perissodactyls. There are about 220 artiodactyl species, including many that are of great economic importance to humans.

Family: Suidae (pigs)
Subfamily: Phacochoerinae
Genus: Phacochoerus
 Common warthog, Phacochoerus africanus LR/lc
Subfamily: Suinae
Genus: Potamochoerus
 Red river hog, Potamochoerus porcus LR/lc
Family: Hippopotamidae (hippopotamuses)
Genus: Hippopotamus
 Hippopotamus, Hippopotamus amphibius VU
Family: Giraffidae (giraffe, okapi)
Genus: Giraffa
 Giraffe, Giraffa camelopardalis VU possibly extirpated
Family: Bovidae (cattle, antelope, sheep, goats)
Subfamily: Alcelaphinae
Genus: Alcelaphus
 Hartebeest, Alcelaphus buselaphus LR/cd
Genus: Damaliscus
 Topi, Damaliscus lunatus LR/cd
Subfamily: Antilopinae
Genus: Gazella
 Dama gazelle, Gazella dama CR
 Dorcas gazelle, Gazella dorcas VU
 Rhim gazelle, Gazella leptoceros EN
 Red-fronted gazelle, Gazella rufifrons VU
Genus: Ourebia
 Oribi, Ourebia ourebi LR/cd
Subfamily: Bovinae
Genus: Syncerus
 Cape buffalo, Syncerus caffer LR/cd
Genus: Tragelaphus
 Giant eland, Tragelaphus derbianus LR/nt
 Bongo, Tragelaphus eurycerus LR/nt
 Bushbuck, Tragelaphus scriptus LR/lc
Subfamily: Caprinae
Genus: Ammotragus
 Barbary sheep, Ammotragus lervia VU
Subfamily: Cephalophinae
Genus: Cephalophus
 Red-flanked duiker, Cephalophus rufilatus LR/cd
Genus: Sylvicapra
 Common duiker, Sylvicapra grimmia LR/lc
Subfamily: Hippotraginae
Genus: Addax
 Addax, Addax nasomaculatus CR
Genus: Hippotragus
 Roan antelope, Hippotragus equinus LR/cd
Genus: Oryx
 Scimitar oryx, Oryx dammah EW
Subfamily: Reduncinae
Genus: Kobus
 Waterbuck, Kobus ellipsiprymnus LR/cd
 Kob, Kobus kob LR/cd
Genus: Redunca
 Bohor reedbuck, Redunca redunca LR/cd

See also
List of chordate orders
Lists of mammals by region
List of prehistoric mammals
Mammal classification
List of mammals described in the 2000s

Notes

References
 

Mali
Mali
Mammals